The Kamennaya Steppe is a Russian federal nature preserve located in Talovsky District in Voronezh Oblast in the watershed of rivers Bityug and Khopyor (both tributaries of the Don).

It is a research institute, where the study of Kamennaya Steppe soils began in 1893 by the father of modern soil science Vasily Dokuchaev.

References 

Protected areas of Russia

1893 establishments in the Russian Empire